Metatropiphorus is a genus of damsel bugs in the family Nabidae. There are at least four described species in Metatropiphorus.

Species
These four species belong to the genus Metatropiphorus:
 Metatropiphorus alvarengai Kerzhner, 1987
 Metatropiphorus belfragii Reuter, 1872
 Metatropiphorus drakei Harris
 Metatropiphorus tabidus Uhler

References

Further reading

 
 

Nabidae
Articles created by Qbugbot